Pluto (minor-planet designation: 134340 Pluto) is a dwarf planet in the Kuiper belt, a ring of bodies beyond the orbit of Neptune. It is the ninth-largest and tenth-most-massive known object to directly orbit the Sun. It is the largest known trans-Neptunian object by volume, by a small margin, but is slightly less massive than Eris. Like other Kuiper belt objects, Pluto is made primarily of ice and rock and is much smaller than the inner planets.  Pluto has only one sixth the mass of Earth's moon, and one third its volume.

Pluto's eccentric orbit  periodically brings it closer to the Sun than Neptune, but a stable orbital resonance prevents them from colliding. 

Pluto has five known moons: Charon, the largest, whose diameter is just over half that of Pluto; Styx; Nix; Kerberos; and Hydra. Pluto and Charon are sometimes considered a binary system because the barycenter of their orbits does not lie within either body, and they are tidally locked. The New Horizons mission was the first spacecraft to visit Pluto and its moons, making a flyby on July 14, 2015 and taking detailed measurements and observations.

Pluto was discovered in 1930, the first object in the Kuiper belt. It was immediately hailed as the ninth planet, but it was always the odd object out, and its planetary status was questioned when it was found to be much smaller than expected. These doubts increased following the discovery of additional objects in the Kuiper belt starting in the 1990s, and particularly the more massive scattered disk object Eris in 2005. In 2006, the International Astronomical Union (IAU) formally redefined the term planet to exclude dwarf planets such as Pluto. Many planetary astronomers, however, continue to consider Pluto and other dwarf planets to be planets.

History

Discovery 

In the 1840s, Urbain Le Verrier used Newtonian mechanics to predict the position of the then-undiscovered planet Neptune after analyzing perturbations in the orbit of Uranus. Subsequent observations of Neptune in the late 19th century led astronomers to speculate that Uranus's orbit was being disturbed by another planet besides Neptune.

In 1906, Percival Lowell—a wealthy Bostonian who had founded Lowell Observatory in Flagstaff, Arizona, in 1894—started an extensive project in search of a possible ninth planet, which he termed "Planet X". By 1909, Lowell and William H. Pickering had suggested several possible celestial coordinates for such a planet. Lowell and his observatory conducted his search until his death in 1916, but to no avail. Unknown to Lowell, his surveys had captured two faint images of Pluto on March 19 and April 7, 1915, but they were not recognized for what they were. There are fourteen other known precovery observations, with the earliest made by the Yerkes Observatory on August 20, 1909.

Percival's widow, Constance Lowell, entered into a ten-year legal battle with the Lowell Observatory over her husband's legacy, and the search for Planet X did not resume until 1929. Vesto Melvin Slipher, the observatory director, gave the job of locating Planet X to 23-year-old Clyde Tombaugh, who had just arrived at the observatory after Slipher had been impressed by a sample of his astronomical drawings.

Tombaugh's task was to systematically image the night sky in pairs of photographs, then examine each pair and determine whether any objects had shifted position. Using a blink comparator, he rapidly shifted back and forth between views of each of the plates to create the illusion of movement of any objects that had changed position or appearance between photographs. On February 18, 1930, after nearly a year of searching, Tombaugh discovered a possible moving object on photographic plates taken on January 23 and 29. A lesser-quality photograph taken on January 21 helped confirm the movement. After the observatory obtained further confirmatory photographs, news of the discovery was telegraphed to the Harvard College Observatory on March 13, 1930.

As one Plutonian year corresponds to 247.94 Earth years, Pluto will complete its first orbit since its discovery in 2178.

Name and symbol 

The name Pluto is for the Roman god of the underworld, from a Greek epithet for Hades.

Upon the announcement of the discovery, Lowell Observatory received over a thousand suggestions for names. Three names topped the list: Minerva, Pluto and Cronus. 'Minerva' was the Lowell staff's first choice but was rejected because it had already been used for an asteroid; Cronus was disfavored because it was promoted by an unpopular and egocentric astronomer, Thomas Jefferson Jackson See. A vote was taken, and 'Pluto' was the unanimous choice. To make sure the name stuck, and that the planet wouldn't suffer changes in its name as Uranus had, Lowell Observatory proposed the name to the American Astronomical Society and the Royal Astronomical Society; both approved it unanimously. The name was published on May 1, 1930. 

The name 'Pluto' had received some 150 nominations among the letters and telegrams sent to Lowell. The first had been from Venetia Burney (1918–2009), an eleven-year-old schoolgirl in Oxford, England, who was interested in classical mythology. She had suggested it to her grandfather Falconer Madan when he read the news of Pluto's discovery to his family over breakfast; Madan passed the suggestion to astronomy professor Herbert Hall Turner, who cabled it to colleagues at Lowell on March 16, three days after the announcement.

The name 'Pluto' was mythologically appropriate: the god Pluto was one of six surviving children of Saturn, and the others had already all been chosen as names of planets (his brothers Jupiter and Neptune, and his sisters Ceres, Juno and Vesta). Both the god and the planet inhabited "gloomy" regions, and the god was able to make himself invisible, as the planet had been for so long. 
The choice was further helped by the fact that the first two letters of Pluto were the initials of Percival Lowell; indeed, 'Percival' had been one of the more popular suggestions for a name for the new planet. Pluto's planetary symbol  was then created as a monogram of the letters "PL". This symbol is rarely used in astronomy today, though it is still common in astrology. However, the most-common astrological symbol for Pluto, now occasionally used in astronomy as well, is an orb (possibly representing Pluto's invisibility cap) over Pluto's bident , which dates to the early 1930s.

The name 'Pluto' was soon embraced by wider culture. In 1930, Walt Disney was apparently inspired by it when he introduced for Mickey Mouse a canine companion named Pluto, although Disney animator Ben Sharpsteen could not confirm why the name was given. In 1941, Glenn T. Seaborg named the newly created element plutonium after Pluto, in keeping with the tradition of naming elements after newly discovered planets, following uranium, which was named after Uranus, and neptunium, which was named after Neptune.

Most languages use the name "Pluto" in various transliterations. In Japanese, Houei Nojiri suggested the calque , and this was borrowed into Chinese and Korean. Some languages of India use the name Pluto, but others, such as Hindi, use the name of Yama, the God of Death in Hinduism. Polynesian languages also tend to use the indigenous god of the underworld, as in Māori Whiro.
Vietnamese might be expected to follow Chinese, but does not because the Sino-Vietnamese word 冥 minh "dark" is homophonous with 明 minh "bright". Vietnamese instead uses Yama, which is also a Buddhist deity, in the form of Sao Diêm Vương 星閻王 "Yama's Star", derived from Chinese 閻王 Yán Wáng / Yìhm Wòhng "King Yama".

Planet X disproved 
Once Pluto was found, its faintness and lack of a viewable disc cast doubt on the idea that it was Lowell's Planet X. Estimates of Pluto's mass were revised downward throughout the 20th century.

Astronomers initially calculated its mass based on its presumed effect on Neptune and Uranus. In 1931, Pluto was calculated to be roughly the mass of Earth, with further calculations in 1948 bringing the mass down to roughly that of Mars. In 1976, Dale Cruikshank, Carl Pilcher and David Morrison of the University of Hawaii calculated Pluto's albedo for the first time, finding that it matched that for methane ice; this meant Pluto had to be exceptionally luminous for its size and therefore could not be more than 1 percent the mass of Earth. (Pluto's albedo is  times that of Earth.)

In 1978, the discovery of Pluto's moon Charon allowed the measurement of Pluto's mass for the first time: roughly 0.2% that of Earth, and far too small to account for the discrepancies in the orbit of Uranus. Subsequent searches for an alternative Planet X, notably by Robert Sutton Harrington, failed. In 1992, Myles Standish used data from Voyager 2'''s flyby of Neptune in 1989, which had revised the estimates of Neptune's mass downward by 0.5%—an amount comparable to the mass of Mars—to recalculate its gravitational effect on Uranus. With the new figures added in, the discrepancies, and with them the need for a Planet X, vanished. Today, the majority of scientists agree that Planet X, as Lowell defined it, does not exist. Lowell had made a prediction of Planet X's orbit and position in 1915 that was fairly close to Pluto's actual orbit and its position at that time; Ernest W. Brown concluded soon after Pluto's discovery that this was a coincidence.

 Classification 

From 1992 onward, many bodies were discovered orbiting in the same volume as Pluto, showing that Pluto is part of a population of objects called the Kuiper belt. This made its official status as a planet controversial, with many questioning whether Pluto should be considered together with or separately from its surrounding population. Museum and planetarium directors occasionally created controversy by omitting Pluto from planetary models of the Solar System. In February 2000 the Hayden Planetarium in New York City displayed a Solar System model of only eight planets, which made headlines almost a year later.

Ceres, Pallas, Juno and Vesta lost their planet status after the discovery of many other asteroids. Similarly, objects increasingly closer in size to Pluto were discovered in the Kuiper belt region. On July 29, 2005, astronomers at Caltech announced the discovery of a new trans-Neptunian object, Eris, which was substantially more massive than Pluto and the most massive object discovered in the Solar System since Triton in 1846. Its discoverers and the press initially called it the tenth planet, although there was no official consensus at the time on whether to call it a planet. Others in the astronomical community considered the discovery the strongest argument for reclassifying Pluto as a minor planet.

 IAU classification 

The debate came to a head in August 2006, with an IAU resolution that created an official definition for the term "planet". According to this resolution, there are three conditions for an object in the Solar System to be considered a planet:
 The object must be in orbit around the Sun.
 The object must be massive enough to be rounded by its own gravity. More specifically, its own gravity should pull it into a shape defined by hydrostatic equilibrium.
 It must have cleared the neighborhood around its orbit.
Pluto fails to meet the third condition. Its mass is substantially less than the combined mass of the other objects in its orbit: 0.07 times, in contrast to Earth, which is 1.7 million times the remaining mass in its orbit (excluding the moon). The IAU further decided that bodies that, like Pluto, meet criteria 1 and 2, but do not meet criterion 3 would be called dwarf planets. In September 2006, the IAU included Pluto, and Eris and its moon Dysnomia, in their Minor Planet Catalogue, giving them the official minor-planet designations "(134340) Pluto", "(136199) Eris", and "(136199) Eris I Dysnomia". Had Pluto been included upon its discovery in 1930, it would have likely been designated 1164, following 1163 Saga, which was discovered a month earlier.

There has been some resistance within the astronomical community toward the reclassification. Alan Stern, principal investigator with NASA's New Horizons mission to Pluto, derided the IAU resolution. He also stated that because less than five percent of astronomers voted for it, the decision was not representative of the entire astronomical community. Marc W. Buie, then at the Lowell Observatory, petitioned against the definition. Others have supported the IAU, for example Mike Brown, the astronomer who discovered Eris.

Public reception to the IAU decision was mixed. A resolution introduced in the California State Assembly facetiously called the IAU decision a "scientific heresy". The New Mexico House of Representatives passed a resolution in honor of Tombaugh, a longtime resident of that state, that declared that Pluto will always be considered a planet while in New Mexican skies and that March 13, 2007, was Pluto Planet Day. The Illinois Senate passed a similar resolution in 2009, on the basis that Clyde Tombaugh, the discoverer of Pluto, was born in Illinois. The resolution asserted that Pluto was "unfairly downgraded to a 'dwarf' planet" by the IAU." Some members of the public have also rejected the change, citing the disagreement within the scientific community on the issue, or for sentimental reasons, maintaining that they have always known Pluto as a planet and will continue to do so regardless of the IAU decision.

In 2006, in its 17th annual words-of-the-year vote, the American Dialect Society voted plutoed as the word of the year. To "pluto" is to "demote or devalue someone or something".

Researchers on both sides of the debate gathered in August 2008, at the Johns Hopkins University Applied Physics Laboratory for a conference that included back-to-back talks on the current IAU definition of a planet. Entitled "The Great Planet Debate", the conference published a post-conference press release indicating that scientists could not come to a consensus about the definition of planet. In June 2008, the IAU had announced in a press release that the term "plutoid" would henceforth be used to refer to Pluto and other planetary-mass objects that have an orbital semi-major axis greater than that of Neptune, though the term has not seen significant use.

 Orbit 

Pluto's orbital period is currently about 248 years. Its orbital characteristics are substantially different from those of the planets, which follow nearly circular orbits around the Sun close to a flat reference plane called the ecliptic. In contrast, Pluto's orbit is moderately inclined relative to the ecliptic (over 17°) and moderately eccentric (elliptical). This eccentricity means a small region of Pluto's orbit lies closer to the Sun than Neptune's. The Pluto–Charon barycenter came to perihelion on September 5, 1989, and was last closer to the Sun than Neptune between February 7, 1979, and February 11, 1999.

Although the 3:2 resonance with Neptune (see below) is maintained, Pluto's inclination and eccentricity behave in a chaotic manner. Computer simulations can be used to predict its position for several million years (both forward and backward in time), but after intervals much longer than the Lyapunov time of 10–20 million years, calculations become unreliable: Pluto is sensitive to immeasurably small details of the Solar System, hard-to-predict factors that will gradually change Pluto's position in its orbit.

The semi-major axis of Pluto's orbit varies between about 39.3 and 39.6 au with a period of about 19,951 years, corresponding to an orbital period varying between 246 and 249 years. The semi-major axis and period are presently getting longer.

 Relationship with Neptune  

Despite Pluto's orbit appearing to cross that of Neptune when viewed from directly above, the two objects' orbits do not intersect. When Pluto is closest to the Sun, and close to Neptune's orbit as viewed from above, it is also the farthest above Neptune's path. Pluto's orbit passes about 8 AU above that of Neptune, preventing a collision.

This alone is not enough to protect Pluto; perturbations from the planets (especially Neptune) could alter Pluto's orbit (such as its orbital precession) over millions of years so that a collision could be possible. However, Pluto is also protected by its 2:3 orbital resonance with Neptune: for every two orbits that Pluto makes around the Sun, Neptune makes three. Each cycle lasts about 495 years. (There are many other objects in this same resonance, called plutinos.) This pattern is such that, in each 495-year cycle, the first time Pluto is near perihelion, Neptune is over 50° behind Pluto. By Pluto's second perihelion, Neptune will have completed a further one and a half of its own orbits, and so will be nearly 130° ahead of Pluto. Pluto and Neptune's minimum separation is over 17 AU, which is greater than Pluto's minimum separation from Uranus (11 AU). The minimum separation between Pluto and Neptune actually occurs near the time of Pluto's aphelion.

The 2:3 resonance between the two bodies is highly stable and has been preserved over millions of years. This prevents their orbits from changing relative to one another, and so the two bodies can never pass near each other. Even if Pluto's orbit were not inclined, the two bodies could never collide. The long term stability of the mean-motion resonance is due to phase protection. When Pluto's period is slightly shorter than 3/2 of Neptune, its orbit relative to Neptune will drift, causing it to make closer approaches behind Neptune's orbit. The gravitational pull between the two then causes angular momentum to be transferred to Pluto, at Neptune's expense. This moves Pluto into a slightly larger orbit, where it travels slightly more slowly, according to Kepler's third law. After many such repetitions, Pluto is sufficiently slowed that Pluto's orbit relative to Neptune drifts in the opposite direction until the process is reversed. The whole process takes about 20,000 years to complete.

 Other factors 
Numerical studies have shown that over millions of years, the general nature of the alignment between the orbits of Pluto and Neptune does not change. There are several other resonances and interactions that enhance Pluto's stability. These arise principally from two additional mechanisms (besides the 2:3 mean-motion resonance).

First, Pluto's argument of perihelion, the angle between the point where it crosses the ecliptic and the point where it is closest to the Sun, librates around 90°. This means that when Pluto is closest to the Sun, it is at its farthest above the plane of the Solar System, preventing encounters with Neptune. This is a consequence of the Kozai mechanism, which relates the eccentricity of an orbit to its inclination to a larger perturbing body—in this case, Neptune. Relative to Neptune, the amplitude of libration is 38°, and so the angular separation of Pluto's perihelion to the orbit of Neptune is always greater than 52° . The closest such angular separation occurs every 10,000 years.

Second, the longitudes of ascending nodes of the two bodies—the points where they cross the ecliptic—are in near-resonance with the above libration. When the two longitudes are the same—that is, when one could draw a straight line through both nodes and the Sun—Pluto's perihelion lies exactly at 90°, and hence it comes closest to the Sun when it is highest above Neptune's orbit. This is known as the 1:1 superresonance. All the Jovian planets, particularly Jupiter, play a role in the creation of the superresonance.

 Quasi-satellite 
In 2012, it was calculated that 15810 Arawn could be a quasi-satellite of Pluto, a specific type of co-orbital configuration. According to the calculations, the object would be a quasi-satellite of Pluto for about 350,000 years out of every two-million-year period. Measurements made by the New Horizons spacecraft in 2015 made it possible to calculate the orbit of Arawn more accurately. These calculations confirmed the earlier ones. However, it is not agreed upon among astronomers whether Arawn should be classified as a quasi-satellite of Pluto based on its orbital dynamics, since its orbit is primarily controlled by Neptune with only occasional perturbations by Pluto.

 Rotation 
Pluto's rotation period, its day, is equal to 6.387 Earth days. Like Uranus, Pluto rotates on its "side" in its orbital plane, with an axial tilt of 120°, and so its seasonal variation is extreme; at its solstices, one-fourth of its surface is in continuous daylight, whereas another fourth is in continuous darkness. The reason for this unusual orientation has been debated. Research from the University of Arizona has suggested that it may be due to the way that a body's spin will always adjust to minimise energy. This could mean a body reorienting itself to put extraneous mass near the equator and regions lacking mass tend towards the poles. This is called polar wander. According to a paper released from the University of Arizona, this could be caused by masses of frozen nitrogen building up in shadowed areas of the dwarf planet. These masses would cause the body to reorient itself, leading to its unusual axial tilt of 120°. The buildup of nitrogen is due to Pluto's vast distance from the Sun. The same effect seen on Pluto would be observed on Earth were the Antarctic ice sheet is several times larger.

 Geology 

 Surface 

The plains on Pluto's surface are composed of more than 98 percent nitrogen ice, with traces of methane and carbon monoxide. Nitrogen and carbon monoxide are most abundant on the anti-Charon face of Pluto (around 180° longitude, where Tombaugh Regio's western lobe, Sputnik Planitia, is located), whereas methane is most abundant near 300° east. The mountains are made of water ice. Pluto's surface is quite varied, with large differences in both brightness and color. Pluto is one of the most contrastive bodies in the Solar System, with as much contrast as Saturn's moon Iapetus. The color varies from charcoal black, to dark orange and white. Pluto's color is more similar to that of Io with slightly more orange and significantly less red than Mars. Notable geographical features include Tombaugh Regio, or the "Heart" (a large bright area on the side opposite Charon), Cthulhu Macula, or the "Whale" (a large dark area on the trailing hemisphere), and the "Brass Knuckles" (a series of equatorial dark areas on the leading hemisphere).

Sputnik Planitia, the western lobe of the "Heart", is a 1,000 km-wide basin of frozen nitrogen and carbon monoxide ices, divided into polygonal cells, which are interpreted as convection cells that carry floating blocks of water ice crust and sublimation pits towards their margins; there are obvious signs of glacial flows both into and out of the basin. It has no craters that were visible to New Horizons, indicating that its surface is less than 10 million years old. Latest studies have shown that the surface has an age of  years.
The New Horizons science team summarized initial findings as "Pluto displays a surprisingly wide variety of geological landforms, including those resulting from glaciological and surface–atmosphere interactions as well as impact, tectonic, possible cryovolcanic, and mass-wasting processes."

In Western parts of Sputnik Planitia there are fields of transverse dunes formed by the winds blowing from the center of Sputnik Planitia in the direction of surrounding mountains. The dune wavelengths are in the range of 0.4–1 km and they are likely consists of methane particles 200–300 μm in size.

 Internal structure 

Because the decay of radioactive elements would eventually heat the ices enough for the rock to separate from them, scientists expect that Pluto's internal structure is differentiated, with the rocky material having settled into a dense core surrounded by a mantle of water ice. Pluto has no magnetic field.

In September 2016, scientists at Brown University simulated the impact thought to have formed Sputnik Planitia, and showed that it might have been the result of liquid water upwelling from below after the collision, implying the existence of a subsurface ocean at least 100 km deep. In June 2020, astronomers reported evidence that Pluto may have had a subsurface ocean, and consequently may have been habitable, when it was first formed. In March 2022, they concluded that peaks on Pluto are actually a merger of "ice volcanoes", suggesting a source of heat on the body at levels previously thought not possible.

 Mass and size 

Its surface gravity is 0.063 g (compared to 1 g for Earth and 0.17 g for the Moon).

The discovery of Pluto's satellite Charon in 1978 enabled a determination of the mass of the Pluto–Charon system by application of Newton's formulation of Kepler's third law. Observations of Pluto in occultation with Charon allowed scientists to establish Pluto's diameter more accurately, whereas the invention of adaptive optics allowed them to determine its shape more accurately.

With less than 0.2 lunar masses, Pluto is much less massive than the terrestrial planets, and also less massive than seven moons: Ganymede, Titan, Callisto, Io, the Moon, Europa, and Triton. The mass is much less than thought before Charon was discovered.

Pluto is more than twice the diameter and a dozen times the mass of Ceres, the largest object in the asteroid belt. It is less massive than the dwarf planet Eris, a trans-Neptunian object discovered in 2005, though Pluto has a larger diameter of 2,376.6 km compared to Eris's approximate diameter of 2,326 km.

Determinations of Pluto's size have been complicated by its atmosphere and hydrocarbon haze. In March 2014, Lellouch, de Bergh et al. published findings regarding methane mixing ratios in Pluto's atmosphere consistent with a Plutonian diameter greater than 2,360 km, with a "best guess" of 2,368 km. Using radio occultation data from the New Horizons Radio Science Experiment (REX), the diameter was found to be .

 Atmosphere 

Pluto has a tenuous atmosphere consisting of nitrogen (N2), methane (CH4), and carbon monoxide (CO), which are in equilibrium with their ices on Pluto's surface. According to the measurements by New Horizons, the surface pressure is about 1 Pa (10 μbar), roughly one million to 100,000 times less than Earth's atmospheric pressure. It was initially thought that, as Pluto moves away from the Sun, its atmosphere should gradually freeze onto the surface; studies of New Horizons data and ground-based occultations show that Pluto's atmospheric density increases, and that it likely remains gaseous throughout Pluto's orbit. New Horizons observations showed that atmospheric escape of nitrogen to be 10,000 times less than expected. Alan Stern has contended that even a small increase in Pluto's surface temperature can lead to exponential increases in Pluto's atmospheric density; from 18 hPa to as much as 280 hPa (three times that of Mars to a quarter that of the Earth). At such densities, nitrogen could flow across the surface as liquid. Just like sweat cools the body as it evaporates from the skin, the sublimation of Pluto's atmosphere cools its surface. Pluto has no or almost no troposphere; observations by New Horizons suggest only a thin tropospheric boundary layer. Its thickness in the place of measurement was 4 km, and the temperature was 37±3 K. The layer is not continuous.

In July 2019, an occultation by Pluto showed that its atmospheric pressure, against expectations, had fallen by 20% since 2016. In 2021, astronomers at the Southwest Research Institute confirmed the result using data from an occultation in 2018, which showed that light was appearing less gradually from behind Pluto's disc, indicating a thinning atmosphere.

The presence of methane, a powerful greenhouse gas, in Pluto's atmosphere creates a temperature inversion, with the average temperature of its atmosphere tens of degrees warmer than its surface, though observations by New Horizons have revealed Pluto's upper atmosphere to be far colder than expected (70 K, as opposed to about 100 K). Pluto's atmosphere is divided into roughly 20 regularly spaced haze layers up to 150 km high, thought to be the result of pressure waves created by airflow across Pluto's mountains.

 Satellites 

Pluto has five known natural satellites. The closest to Pluto is Charon. First identified in 1978 by astronomer James Christy, Charon is the only moon of Pluto that may be in hydrostatic equilibrium. Charon's mass is sufficient to cause the barycenter of the Pluto–Charon system to be outside Pluto. Beyond Charon there are four much smaller circumbinary moons. In order of distance from Pluto they are Styx, Nix, Kerberos, and Hydra. Nix and Hydra were both discovered in 2005, Kerberos was discovered in 2011, and Styx was discovered in 2012. The satellites' orbits are circular (eccentricity < 0.006) and coplanar with Pluto's equator (inclination < 1°), and therefore tilted approximately 120° relative to Pluto's orbit. The Plutonian system is highly compact: the five known satellites orbit within the inner 3% of the region where prograde orbits would be stable.

The orbital periods of all Pluto's moons are linked in a system of orbital resonances and near resonances. When precession is accounted for, the orbital periods of Styx, Nix, and Hydra are in an exact 18:22:33 ratio. There is a sequence of approximate ratios, 3:4:5:6, between the periods of Styx, Nix, Kerberos, and Hydra with that of Charon; the ratios become closer to being exact the further out the moons are.

The Pluto–Charon system is one of the few in the Solar System whose barycenter lies outside the primary body; the Patroclus–Menoetius system is a smaller example, and the Sun–Jupiter system is the only larger one. The similarity in size of Charon and Pluto has prompted some astronomers to call it a double dwarf planet. The system is also unusual among planetary systems in that each is tidally locked to the other, which means that Pluto and Charon always have the same hemisphere facing each other — a property shared by only one other known system, Eris and Dysnomia. From any position on either body, the other is always at the same position in the sky, or always obscured. This also means that the rotation period of each is equal to the time it takes the entire system to rotate around its barycenter.

In 2007, observations by the Gemini Observatory of patches of ammonia hydrates and water crystals on the surface of Charon suggested the presence of active cryo-geysers.

Pluto's moons are hypothesized to have been formed by a collision between Pluto and a similar-sized body, early in the history of the Solar System. The collision released material that consolidated into the moons around Pluto.

  Origin 

Pluto's origin and identity had long puzzled astronomers. One early hypothesis was that Pluto was an escaped moon of Neptune knocked out of orbit by Neptune's largest current moon, Triton. This idea was eventually rejected after dynamical studies showed it to be impossible because Pluto never approaches Neptune in its orbit.

Pluto's true place in the Solar System began to reveal itself only in 1992, when astronomers began to find small icy objects beyond Neptune that were similar to Pluto not only in orbit but also in size and composition. This trans-Neptunian population is thought to be the source of many short-period comets. Pluto is now known to be the largest member of the Kuiper belt, a stable belt of objects located between 30 and 50 AU from the Sun. As of 2011, surveys of the Kuiper belt to magnitude 21 were nearly complete and any remaining Pluto-sized objects are expected to be beyond 100 AU from the Sun. Like other Kuiper-belt objects (KBOs), Pluto shares features with comets; for example, the solar wind is gradually blowing Pluto's surface into space. It has been claimed that if Pluto were placed as near to the Sun as Earth, it would develop a tail, as comets do. This claim has been disputed with the argument that Pluto's escape velocity is too high for this to happen. It has been proposed that Pluto may have formed as a result of the agglomeration of numerous comets and Kuiper-belt objects.

Though Pluto is the largest Kuiper belt object discovered, Neptune's moon Triton, which is larger than Pluto, is similar to it both geologically and atmospherically, and is thought to be a captured Kuiper belt object. Eris (see above) is about the same size as Pluto (though more massive) but is not strictly considered a member of the Kuiper belt population. Rather, it is considered a member of a linked population called the scattered disc.

Many Kuiper belt objects, like Pluto, are in a 2:3 orbital resonance with Neptune. KBOs with this orbital resonance are called "plutinos", after Pluto.

Like other members of the Kuiper belt, Pluto is thought to be a residual planetesimal; a component of the original protoplanetary disc around the Sun that failed to fully coalesce into a full-fledged planet. Most astronomers agree that Pluto owes its current position to a sudden migration undergone by Neptune early in the Solar System's formation. As Neptune migrated outward, it approached the objects in the proto-Kuiper belt, setting one in orbit around itself (Triton), locking others into resonances, and knocking others into chaotic orbits. The objects in the scattered disc, a dynamically unstable region overlapping the Kuiper belt, are thought to have been placed in their current positions by interactions with Neptune's migrating resonances. A computer model created in 2004 by Alessandro Morbidelli of the Observatoire de la Côte d'Azur in Nice suggested that the migration of Neptune into the Kuiper belt may have been triggered by the formation of a 1:2 resonance between Jupiter and Saturn, which created a gravitational push that propelled both Uranus and Neptune into higher orbits and caused them to switch places, ultimately doubling Neptune's distance from the Sun. The resultant expulsion of objects from the proto-Kuiper belt could also explain the Late Heavy Bombardment 600 million years after the Solar System's formation and the origin of the Jupiter trojans. It is possible that Pluto had a near-circular orbit about 33 AU from the Sun before Neptune's migration perturbed it into a resonant capture. The Nice model requires that there were about a thousand Pluto-sized bodies in the original planetesimal disk, which included Triton and Eris.

 Observation and exploration 
Pluto's distance from Earth makes its in-depth study and exploration difficult. On July 14, 2015, NASA's New Horizons space probe flew through the Pluto system, providing much information about it.

 Observation 

Pluto's visual apparent magnitude averages 15.1, brightening to 13.65 at perihelion. To see it, a telescope is required; around 30 cm (12 in) aperture being desirable. It looks star-like and without a visible disk even in large telescopes, because its angular diameter is maximum 0.11".

The earliest maps of Pluto, made in the late 1980s, were brightness maps created from close observations of eclipses by its largest moon, Charon. Observations were made of the change in the total average brightness of the Pluto–Charon system during the eclipses. For example, eclipsing a bright spot on Pluto makes a bigger total brightness change than eclipsing a dark spot. Computer processing of many such observations can be used to create a brightness map. This method can also track changes in brightness over time.

Better maps were produced from images taken by the Hubble Space Telescope (HST), which offered higher resolution, and showed considerably more detail, resolving variations several hundred kilometers across, including polar regions and large bright spots. These maps were produced by complex computer processing, which finds the best-fit projected maps for the few pixels of the Hubble images. These remained the most detailed maps of Pluto until the flyby of New Horizons in July 2015, because the two cameras on the HST used for these maps were no longer in service.

 Exploration 

The New Horizons spacecraft, which flew by Pluto in July 2015, is the first and so far only attempt to explore Pluto directly. Launched in 2006, it captured its first (distant) images of Pluto in late September 2006 during a test of the Long Range Reconnaissance Imager. The images, taken from a distance of approximately 4.2 billion kilometers, confirmed the spacecraft's ability to track distant targets, critical for maneuvering toward Pluto and other Kuiper belt objects. In early 2007 the craft made use of a gravity assist from Jupiter.New Horizons made its closest approach to Pluto on July 14, 2015, after a 3,462-day journey across the Solar System. Scientific observations of Pluto began five months before the closest approach and continued for at least a month after the encounter. Observations were conducted using a remote sensing package that included imaging instruments and a radio science investigation tool, as well as spectroscopic and other experiments. The scientific goals of New Horizons were to characterize the global geology and morphology of Pluto and its moon Charon, map their surface composition, and analyze Pluto's neutral atmosphere and its escape rate. On October 25, 2016, at 05:48 pm ET, the last bit of data (of a total of 50 billion bits of data; or 6.25 gigabytes) was received from New Horizons from its close encounter with Pluto.

Since the New Horizons flyby, scientists have advocated for an orbiter mission that would return to Pluto to fulfill new science objectives. The last objective could be accomplished using laser pulses to generate a complete topographic map of Pluto. New Horizons principal investigator Alan Stern has advocated for a Cassini-style orbiter that would launch around 2030 (the 100th anniversary of Pluto's discovery) and use Charon's gravity to adjust its orbit as needed to fulfill science objectives after arriving at the Pluto system. The orbiter could then use Charon's gravity to leave the Pluto system and study more KBOs after all Pluto science objectives are completed. A conceptual study funded by the NASA Innovative Advanced Concepts (NIAC) program describes a fusion-enabled Pluto orbiter and lander based on the Princeton field-reversed configuration reactor.Fusion-Enabled Pluto Orbiter and Lander - Phase I Final Report. (PDF) Stephanie Thomas, Princeton Satellite Systems. 2017.

 Sub-Charon hemisphere 
The equatorial region of the sub-Charon hemisphere of Pluto has only been imaged at low resolution, as New Horizons made its closest approach to the anti-Charon hemisphere.

Sources:

 Southern hemisphere New Horizons imaged all of Pluto's northern hemisphere, and the equatorial regions down to about 30° South. Higher southern latitudes have only been observed, at very low resolution, from Earth. Images from the Hubble Space Telescope in 1996 cover 85% of Pluto and show large albedo features down to about 75° South. This is enough to show the extent of the temperate-zone maculae. Later images had slightly better resolution, due to minor improvements in Hubble instrumentation.

Some albedo variations in the higher southern latitudes could be detected by New Horizons using Charon-shine (light reflected off Charon). The south polar region seems to be darker than the north polar region, but there is a high-albedo region in the southern hemisphere that may be a regional nitrogen or methane ice deposit.

 Videos 

 See also 

 How I Killed Pluto and Why It Had It Coming List of geological features on Pluto
 Pluto in astrology
 Pluto in fiction
 Stats of planets in the Solar System

 Notes 

 References 

 Further reading 

 Codex Regius (2016), Pluto & Charon, CreateSpace Independent Publishing Platform 
 Stern, S A and Tholen, D J (1997), Pluto and Charon'', University of Arizona Press

External links 

 New Horizons homepage
 Pluto Profile at NASA's Solar System Exploration site
 NASA Pluto factsheet
 Website of the observatory that discovered Pluto
 Earth telescope image of Pluto system
 Keck infrared with AO of Pluto system
 Video – Pluto – viewed through the years (GIF) (NASA; animation; July 15, 2015).
 Video – Pluto – "FlyThrough" (00:22; MP4) (YouTube) (NASA; animation; August 31, 2015).
 "A Day on Pluto Video made from July 2015 New Horizon Images" Scientific American
 NASA CGI video of Pluto flyover (July 14, 2017)
 CGI video simulation of rotating Pluto by Seán Doran (see album for more)
 Google Pluto 3D, interactive map of the dwarf planet
 

 
Articles containing video clips
19300218
Discoveries by Clyde Tombaugh
134340
Minor planets visited by spacecraft
Pluto
134340
Plutinos
134340
Dwarf planets